Pravega Racing is the official Formula-SAE Combustion team of VIT University, Vellore, India. The primary aim of the team is to design, manufacture, and test a single seater race car and compete in the Formula Student/FSAE events. The team consists of 40 inter-disciplinary undergraduates who have persistently worked towards building faster and lighter cars throughout the years since its inception and is majorly divided into two, namely the Technical and the Management Department. The team has participated in several National and International FSAE Events over the years conducted in USA (2010), Italy (2011, 2012, and 2013), Germany (2014, 2015, 2016,2017,2019), India (2015, 2016, 2017) and Australia (2018).

Currently the team participates in Formula Student Germany held in August and Formula Bharat held in January.

Recently the team took part in Formula Student Germany 2019, where the team won D-BASF Best Use of 3D Printing Award and also scored the highest in Design Report Event among Indian Teams.

History 

Pravega Racing was established in 2005 by a group of students from Vellore Institute of technology (VIT) with the sole purpose of lending some leverage to their theoretical knowledge through hands on practical experience. The team Booststraped and made a prototype race car in the next 2 years. https://www.youtube.com/watch?v=CNJf2lAS6qY the very first car from Pravega. While the team could not raise funding for building the final prototype to participate they had succeeded in creating a proof of concept which became the foundation for all the futures cars that got built.

The team secured third position in its first attempt in SAE-Design Challenge, 2009. The performance in the event motivated the members to take it to International Formula Student Events. In 2010 the team took part in Formula SAE West held in California, USA. Manufacturing a car that met the international standards was the biggest challenge faced in its maiden international outing. Although the team was not able to qualify the technical inspection, the motivated members secured 8th position in the Cost and Manufacturing Event.

One of the major challenges in the 2011 season came down to shifting from a 500 cc Kawasaki Engine to a 600 cc Honda CBR RR which caused delays in manufacturing, and henceforth the team was placed at an overall 45th position in Formula SAE Italy 2011.

In 2012, led by Hemant Agarwal, the mammoth task of manufacturing 2 cars in a single season was undertaken. The team improved its performance in the dynamic events in FSAE- Italy 2012 and dominated the Statics Event: 3rd in Cost and Manufacturing Event. The impressive Overall 3rd position in SAE-SUPRA 2012 established them as one of the front runners among the Indian Formula Student circuit.

The year 2013, was the breakthrough year for the team at FSAE-Italy. The car underwent a complete makeover for this season. Led by Prateek Sibal, the team won several accolades in the events such as 2nd in Cost and Manufacturing, 11th in Business Presentation, 19th in Engineering Design and 20th Overall. The team completed in the all important endurance event for the first time as well.

The experience gained in Italy prompted the team to take part in a much more competitive environment. The team led by Sanshray Agarwal, was the only Indian team to participate in all the dynamic events at FSG 2014.

Following a similar concept as the Formula Student events, Formula Design Challenge 2015 was aimed to provide Indian FS teams with a better platform to test their potential. The event witnessed active participation from several luminaries of the automotive industry: Claude Rouelle and Pat Clarke (Design Judges). Headed by Kushagra Sinha, Pravega Racing completed the competition with podium finishes in all static events, a breathtaking run in the autocross event, and an Overall 3rd position. Following that, the team also participated in FSG 2015 and achieved the best statics result by any Indian team in Formula Student Germany history.

Gaining the much needed experience, the team led by Tribhuvan Singh went onto participating at Formula Student India 2016, bagging several accolades, and winning 7 out of 11 trophies with podium finishes in all static events. In the same year, the team also took part in FSG 2016 where it proved to be the fastest among all Indian teams.

Moving upwards on the ladder of success, in 2017 the team led by Abhijai Tibrewala went onto become the defending champions at Formula Bharat 2017, bagging a total of 9 trophies with podium finishes in both static and dynamic events. The team was also awarded the Best Driver Award and a Special Award for Spirit of FSI. Further, the team also took part in FSG 2017 where it was one of the best Indian teams at the event.

The experience gained over the years helped the team move forward to participate at Formula SAE Australasia 2018, where the team led by Naman Shukla led onto gaining the highest ever points scored by an Indian team at the Engineering Design Event. The team was also awarded the FSAE-A Encouragement Award for its exhilarating performance.

Last season, the team led by Nithin Shanmugam participated at FSG 2019, where the team got its first ever international podium by winning the D-BASF Best Use of 3D Printing Award. The team was also the highest to score in the Engineering Design Event among Indian Teams.

Team Ideology

Philosophy 
The team follows a simple policy: Having a respectful disregard for the impossible. Pravega Racing focuses on first building an ‘A’ team, and then building an ‘A’ car: As for the team members, they are not just students of a technical university but a right combination of engineers, writers, bloggers, designers, managers, analysts, strategists and drivers.

Management Structure 
The team follows a “Functional Organizational Model” headed by the Chief Operating Officer, Chief Management Officer and Chief Technical Officer of the team. The COO is tasked with overseeing the day-to-day administrative and operational functions of the team. The CMO is responsible for activities related to creating, communicating and delivering offerings that have value for the team and sponsors. The CTO's primary role is to make sure that the technical departments coordinate and work smoothly to achieve the team's overall goals.

The entire team's workflow is conducted through the individual Department Leads who validate and sanction duties of the Student/Junior Engineer. This system is then monitored by the CTO and the COO. Via the CTO, COO and the Department Leads, the work is completed within the prescribed stipulated time. The responsibility of maintaining order and organizing stands with the Team managers.

To testify the improvements carried out by the respected departments before and after the testing phases, a Testing Lead is appointed. The training of the drivers as well as validating the driver-car interactions to meeting the infield demands is undertaken by the Testing Lead. The Statics Lead along with the CMO and the Team Manager focuses on the Business Presentation, Cost Report and Engineering Design Report. The person in charge ensures that all the documents of any particular event remain intact without any discrepancies to the idea nor rules.

To maximize efficiency and productive output of individual departments, the Department Leads double their roles and head the Research and Development as well. The workforce is further split based on their skill set into Dynamics & Statics, BP & CR, Marketing and PR teams. This ensures frictionless communication and enables efficient coordination within the team.

Formula Student Seasons

Season 2013-14 

The season marked the introduction of new packages which gave the car, PRV13 a whole new look compared to the previous cars. The team captain Prateek Sibal lead the team to new heights at Formula Student Italy as the team came 20th overall in the event and competed for the first time in the endurance event.

Achievements

Formula Student Italy 2013 
 2nd in Cost event
 11th in Business Presentation
 18th in Endurance
 19th in Design event
 25th in Acceleration event

Technical Specifications of PRV 13

Season 2014-15 
Gathering the relevant experience from the FSAE Events participated, the team decided to participate in the most competitive FSAE event held in Germany.
The team led by Sanshray Agarwal entered the competition by being 1st in the scrutinizing exam. They also stood out by being the only Indian team to participate in all the dynamic events.

Achievements

Formula Student Germany 2014 
1. They stood 1st worldwide in the scrutinizing exam.

2. Only Indian team to participate in all the dynamic events.

Technical Specifications of PRV14

Season 2015-16 
The 2015-16 Season started out fresh with the JK Tyre Formula Design Challenge, which was the first Indian Event the team took part in its history. Led by team captain Kushagra Sinha and team manager Shyam Mohan, the team won several accolades and was noted as they set the national record of completing the autocross lap in 1 Minute and 23 Second, which is still unbeaten. This was followed by their second participation in Formula Student Germany 2015, where the team stood out by giving the best results in the static events by an Indian Team in that event.

Achievements

JK Tyre Formula Design Challenge 2015 
 3rd Overall
 2nd in Engineering Design Event.
 2nd in Auto Cross Events
 3rd in Business Presentation Event.
 3rd in Cost & Manufacturing Event.
 3rd in Skid pad Event.

Formula Student Germany 2015 
 8th in Cost & Manufacturing.
 10th in Business Presentation Event.
 21st in Engineering Design Event.

Technical Specifications of PRV15

Season 2016-17 
Season 2016-17 was the year that changed the whole face of the team as they started off by winning in 7 out of the 11 events in Formula Student India 2016. It was a big achievement which gave them enough motivation to deliver the best results given by an India Formula Student Team in Formula Student Germany period.

The team led by Tribhuvan Singh and team manager Vyom Gautam was noted well in the event for being the fastest Indian car driven at Formula Student Germany. The team succeeded in delivering a stand out performance in the event as promised by them.

Achievements

Formula Student India 2016 
 1st in the Acceleration Event
 1st in the Skid pad Event
 1st in the Business Presentation Event
 3rd in the Engineering Design Event
 3rd in the Cost & Manufacturing Event
 Special Awards for Spirit of FSI and Cleanest Pit

Formula Student Germany 2016 
 13th in Business Presentation Event
 39th in Design Event
 40th in Cost Event
 37th in Acceleration Event (4.65 seconds)
 41st in Skidpad Event (6.39 seconds)
 53rd in AutoCross Event (87.88 seconds)

Technical Specifications of PRV16

Season 2017-18 
Season 2017-18 started off with the burning desire to become the best team in India. Moving upwards on the ladder of success, the team led by Abhijai Tibrewala went onto become the defending champions at Formula Bharat 2017, bagging a total of 9 trophies with podium finishes in both static and dynamic events. The team was also awarded the Best Driver Award and a Special Award for Spirit of FSI. Further, the team also took part in FSG 2017 where it was one of the best Indian teams at the event.

Achievements

Formula Bharat 2017 
 1st overall
 1st in Autocross
 1st in Acceleration
 1st in Cost Event
 1st in Business Presentation Event
 2nd in Skidpad
 2nd in Endurance
 Special Award for Spirit of FSI
 Best Driver Award

Formula Student Germany 2017 
 18th in Business Presentation Event
 22nd in Cost Event
 55th in Design Event
 24th in Endurance Event

Technical Specifications of PRV17

Season 2018-19 
With much of the experience gained over the years, in the Season 2018–19, our team went onto participate at Formula SAE Australasia 2018, where the team led by Naman Shukla and team manager Nikhil Agrawal led onto gaining the highest ever points scored by an Indian team at the Engineering Design Event. The team was also awarded the FSAE-A Encouragement Award for its exhilarating performance

Achievements

Formula Student Australasia 2018 
 FSAE-A Encouragement Award
 14th Overall
 4th in Engineering Design Event
 10th in Business Presentation Event
 16th in Cost & Manufacturing Event
 10th in Acceleration Event

Technical Specifications of PRV18

Season 2019-20 
Learning from its past failures, the Season 2019-20 started off with major focus on static events. The team led by Nithin Shanmugam and Akash Porwal participated at FSG 2019, where the team got its first ever international podium by winning the D-BASF Best Use of 3D Printing Award. The team was also the highest to score in the Engineering Design Event among Indian Teams.

Achievements

Formula Student Germany 2019 
 D-BASF Best Use of 3D Printing Award
 15th in Business Presentation Event
 15th in Design Event
 43rd in Cost Event
 35th in Skidpad Event

Technical Specifications of PRV19

Sponsors and PR Activities 

The design and manufacturing of a Formula Car is quite expensive. As a student run team, sponsors play an integral role in augmenting to the team's success and hence they make sure to maintain a cordial relation with an effective sponsorship management system. In order to meet finances, the marketing team approaches multinational companies and request for technical and monetary support. Pravega Racing currently holds sponsorship ties with major automotive companies of which Volkswagen, Continental, Autodesk, SKF and Vega who are the title sponsors of the team. Companies such as TE Connectivity, Novoflex, Mahale, Wipro and Mentor Graphics are its Gold Sponsors.

The team conducts several PR Activities for its sponsors as a token of appreciation. These include the Red Bull Calendar Shoot, Engage Deodorant Marketing Campaign, Cornitos Calendar shoot, stunt shows at the Annual College Cultural Fest, Riviera; and special sponsor appreciation during the Official Rollout of the car annually which recently included a drag race between PRV18 and Volkswagen.

The team has also partnered with PR Teams, including Wharf Street Strategies and Autoguru for several brand building campaigns and to provide superior quality media for the team presentations and showcase events. This allows the team to reach a wider audience, enhancing their scope for future sponsorship's too.

References

 http://pravega-racing.com/
 https://www.formulastudent.de/teams/fsc/details/tid/119/
 https://www.wishberry.in/campaign/pravega-racing-fundrace-3
 https://issuu.com/pravegaracing/docs/images
 http://autogurus.blogspot.com/2020/01/meet-pravega-racing-one-of-indias-best.html?m=1

External links
 http://pravega-racing.com/
 http://www.formulastudent.de
 http://www.vit.ac.in

Education in Vellore